Khazhnimakhi (Dargwa: ХIяжнимахьи) is a rural locality (a selo) in Dubrimakhinsky Selsoviet, Akushinsky District, Republic of Dagestan, Russia. The population was 143 as of 2010.

Geography 
Khazhnimakhi is located 4 km southeast of Akusha (the district's administrative centre) by road, on the Gandara River. Khazhnimakhi is the nearest rural locality.

References 

Rural localities in Akushinsky District